DSF may refer to:

Business

 Dubai Shopping Festival, a prime festival/retail season in Dubai
 David Suzuki Foundation, a Canadian environmental charity

 DSF Refractories & Minerals Ltd, a British refractory brick manufacturer
 Deutsches Sportfernsehen, the former name of the German TV channel Sport1

Organizations
 Danish Actors' Association, a Danish trade union
National Union of Students in Denmark (Danish: Danske Studerendes Fællesråd, DSF), an umbrella organisation of students' unions at higher education facilities in Denmark.
 Duisenberg School of Finance, an educational organization in the Netherlands
 Delaware State Fair, in the United States
 Director Special Forces, the British Major General commanding United Kingdom Special Forces
 Society for German–Soviet Friendship (Gesellschaft für Deutsch-Sowjetische Freundschaft), a historical and popular political organization in East Germany
 Digital solidarity fund, a defunct Swiss NGO
 Democratic Students' Front, an independent political students' organization of Jadavpur University

Science and technology
 Dispersion-shifted fiber, a type of optical fiber
 DSD Stream File, a file format for Direct Stream Digital encoded audio recordings
 Django Software Foundation, a non-profit foundation to support Django (a web programming framework) development
 Driver: San Francisco, a video game
 Differential scanning fluorimetry, a thermal shift assay technique
 Discrete Summation Formulas, mathematical formulae used in a method of distortion synthesis
 Dynamic Frequency Selection, a method in Wi-Fi network

Other
 Dion Sembie-Ferris (born 1996), English footballer
 Double-skin facade, a type of building facade
 Douglas S. Freeman High School, a high school in Richmond, Virginia